Giulia Grancini (born May 5, 1984) is an Italian physicist who is a Professor of Chemistry at the University of Pavia. Her work considers new materials for photovoltaic devices, including perovskites and polymer-based materials. In 2020, Grancini was named the Royal Society of Chemistry Journal of Materials Chemistry Lecturer.

Early life and education 
Grancini was born in Pavia. She attended the Polytechnic University of Milan. During her doctorate degree she spent one year at the University of Oxford, where she investigated polymer solar cells. Grancini returned to Italy, where she worked as a postdoctoral researcher at the Istituto Italiano di Tecnologia. She spent a year as a visiting researcher at the University of Utah working on the physics of hybrid materials with Zeev Vardeny.

Research and career 
Grancini investigates the interfaces of optoelectronic devices, including organic and organic-inorganic perovskites. She moved to the École Polytechnique Fédérale de Lausanne (EPFL) in 2015, where she was awarded a Marie Skłodowska-Curie Fellowship to join the research group of Mohammad Khaja Nazeeruddin. At EPFL she established her own independent research group looking at novel materials for photovoltaics. She was awarded a Swiss National Science Foundation Ambizione Energy grant to study multi-dimensional interfaces for efficient and stable perovskite solar cells. She has pioneered hybrid two- and three-dimensional perovskite systems, which can demonstrate high stability and impressive performance in photovoltaic devices. Grancini makes use of ultra-fast spectroscopies to study the dynamics of the photoexcited states of perovskite materials.

In 2018, Grancini was awarded a European Research Council Starting Grant. Her proposal, HYbrid NANOstructured multi-functional interfaces for stable, efficient and eco-friendly photovoltaic devices, looks to realise environmentally friendly perovskites and metal-organic frameworks. She was appointed to the faculty at the University of Pavia in 2019, where she leads the PVsquared2 team.

Awards and honours 
 2015 Edison Company & Alessandro Volta Foundation National Award for Physics
 2017 International Union of Pure and Applied Physics Young Scientist Prize in Optics
 2019 Elected Vice Chair Selection Committee of the Young Academy of Europe
 2019 Swiss Physical Society Award in Applied Physics
 2020 USERN Ambassador for Italy
 2020 Royal Society of Chemistry Journal of Materials Chemistry Lectureship
 2020 100 Donne nella Scienza Contro gli Stereotipi

Selected publications

References 

Italian physical chemists
Academic staff of the University of Pavia
Polytechnic University of Milan alumni
Academic staff of the École Polytechnique Fédérale de Lausanne
People from Pavia
Italian women physicists
21st-century Italian  physicists
21st-century Italian women scientists
1984 births
Living people